I fratelli Dinamite (internationally released as The Dynamite Brothers) is a 1949 Italian animation film directed by Nino and Toni Pagot.

It is considered the first Italian feature-length animated film and the first Italian film in Technicolor together with La Rosa di Bagdad by Anton Gino Domeneghini which was also released in 1949. The production of the film begun in 1942, and it was held back by a bombing that destroyed original drawings for the film.

The film premiered at the 10th Venice International Film Festival.

References

Further reading
 Roberto Della Torre, Marco Pagot, I fratelli Dinamite. Una storia molto animata, Il Castoro, 2004. .
 Alice Basso, I fratelli dinamite. La storia, i giochi e i personaggi, Il Castoro, 2004. .

External links

1949 films
Italian animated films
1949 animated films
1940s Italian-language films
1940s Italian films